Wire-to-wire is a term used in competitive events and sports for a champion who maintained the lead during an entire competition. The term originated from horse racing where a wire would stretch across the start and finish line thus the euphemism describes a horse that lead from wire to wire or start to finish.

Australian-rules football 
Only seven teams have completed a wire-to-wire premiership season in the Australian Football League (formerly called the Victorian Football League from 1897 to 1989): Fitzroy in 1904, Collingwood in 1915, Essendon in 1923 and 2000, Geelong in 1953, West Coast in 1991, and Port Adelaide in 2020.

Baseball 
Only five teams have completed wire-to-wire seasons in Major League Baseball, occupying top position of the standings for every day of their season and winning the World Series, with those teams being the 1927 New York Yankees, 1955 Brooklyn Dodgers, 1984 Detroit Tigers, 1990 Cincinnati Reds and the 2005 Chicago White Sox. 

In the KBO League, the SSG Landers accomplished this feat by occupying the top position for every day of the 2022 season and then subsequently winning the Korean Series. This was the first time ever a baseball team has completed a wire-to-wire season in Korea.

Basketball 
Per the Elias Sports Bureau three National Basketball Association teams have completed wire-to-wire victories to clinch an NBA title since 1970 - the 1982 Los Angeles Lakers, the 1986 Boston Celtics, and the 2020 Lakers.

Golf 
The term is used in golf referencing a player who wins a title while holding the lowest aggregate score at the close of each round. The Masters Tournament has only had five winners complete a wire-to-wire tournament, those players being Craig Wood in 1941, Arnold Palmer in 1960, Jack Nicklaus in 1972, Raymond Floyd in 1976 and Jordan Spieth in 2015.

Horse racing 
Since 1875 the Kentucky Derby has only had 23 winners complete a wire-to-wire run with Authentic completing this feat in 2020.

References

Sports terminology